The local self-government system is a non-governmental system organizing the activities of citizens in Azerbaijan, which was proclaimed in December 1999 and has the right to freely and independently solve local issues within the law. This right is implemented by collegial bodies (municipalities) that consisting of representatives elected on the basis of universal, direct and equal elections by secret and individual ballot in the manner prescribed by law. Municipalities may establish permanent executive structures for executing their authority.

The right of citizens of the Republic of Azerbaijan to carry out local self government 
Azerbaijani citizens carry out the right of local self-government to say an independent opinion, make suggestions by the municipal elections. Citizens may carry out self-governmental bodies both directly or through freely chosen representatives regardless of race, nationality, religion, sex, origin, convictions, property status, social position, political party, trade union organization. Azerbaijanies have the right to elect and be elected to local self-governmental bodies. Each citizen has the right to apply to the municipalities, municipal bodies and their officials. Municipalities, municipal bodies and their officials must provide citizens with documents and materials directly to related to human and civil rights and freedoms, as well as they must inform about activities of municipalities.

Legislation on local self-government 
Legislation on local self-government regulated with Constitution and Laws of Azerbaijan and acts of the appropriate executive bodies of the Republic (and in Nakhchivan, Constitution, and laws of Nakhchivan AR, acts of the appropriate executive bodies of the Nakhchivan).

The charter of the municipality 
The charter of the municipality is passed by the meeting of municipalities or citizens. The composition and borders of the municipality, names, structure, terms of officials, the procedure of adoption and entry into force of municipal statutes, guarantees for the rights of officials of municipalities were stated in the content of charter.

References

See also 
National Assembly of Azerbaijan

Cabinet of Azerbaijan

1999 in law
National legislatures
1999 establishments in Azerbaijan